The Australia national cricket team toured India in the 2004–05 season and played a four-match Test series, during October and November 2004, against India, Australia winning the series 2–1 with one match drawn, their first series win on Indian soil since their 1969-70 tour. The future Australian Test captain, Michael Clarke, made his Test debut in the first match, scoring 151 in the first innings. In the fourth match of the series, Clarke took 6 wickets for 9 runs in the second innings.

Tour match

First class: Mumbai v Australians

Test series

1st Test

2nd Test

3rd Test

4th Test

References

External links
 Series home on CricInfo

2004 in Australian cricket
2004 in Indian cricket
2004-05
Indian cricket seasons from 2000–01
International cricket competitions in 2004–05